Summer Me! Johnny Frigo Live at Battle Ground is a 2008 compilation by jazz violinist Johnny Frigo from his appearances at the Indiana Fiddlers' Gathering between 1985 and 1997. The album was released posthumously. A hidden track, an unaccompanied violin solo of "Estrellita" dating from June 30, 1985, closes the album.

Track listing 
Quando, Quando, Quando
The Song Is You
Polka Dots and Moonbeams
Czardas
Pennies from Heaven
Nuages
Summer Me, Winter Me
Medley: America the Beautiful/Strike Up the Band
Summertime
Pick Yourself Up
Here's That Rainy Day
I'll Remember April
Get Happy
In a Sentimental Mood
(Back Home in) Indiana
Estrellita (unlisted hidden track)

Personnel
 Johnny Frigo – violin
 Don Stiernberg – mandolin
 John Parrott – guitar
 Greg Cahill – banjo
 Jim Cox – double bass

References

Johnny Frigo albums
Live swing albums
2008 live albums